This article is about Māori naming customs in New Zealand.

Before the 1800s, Māori children would be called by one given name (simple or composite). These names were attributed to remarkable events around birth. Later in life a person might be given a new name relating to subsequent events.

1800–1900 
With the arrival of Europeans, surnames were introduced and soon after a Māori surname system was devised where a person would take their father's name as a surname, for example:

Ariki – Maunga Ariki – Waiora Maunga – Te Awa Waiora – Waipapa Te Awa

Māori would also have translations of their names, for example:

John Te Awa – Hone River – John River – Hone Waipapa Te Awa – John Waipapa Te Awa – Hone Waipapa – John Waipapa

References 

Naming customs
Maori